Jandira Feghali (born 17 May 1957 in Curitiba, PR) is a physician, unionist and politician member of the Communist Party of Brazil (PCdoB).

Background
She is sister of the piano and keyboard player Ricardo Feghali, member of the Brazilian band Roupa Nova. Jandira is mother of two children. Her family is of Lebanese descent, and her aunt was the iconic Lebanese singer Sabah (birth name Jeanette Gergis Feghali). In 2019, he was appointed to lead the minority in the House of Representatives.

References

External links 
  

|-

|-

|-

Members of the Chamber of Deputies (Brazil) from Rio de Janeiro (state)
Living people
1957 births
Communist Party of Brazil politicians
20th-century Brazilian women politicians
21st-century Brazilian women politicians
Brazilian people of Lebanese descent
Politicians from Curitiba
20th-century Brazilian physicians
Brazilian feminists
Brazilian women physicians